Binko may refer to:

Places

Mali 
 Binko, Koulikoro, commune in Mali
 Binko, Sikasso, small town in Mali

Other uses 
 Binko, a talking ape in LostWinds (Wii-game)